Duet is an album by vibraphonist Gary Burton and pianist Chick Corea recorded in 1978 and released on the ECM label in 1979. The album is the second studio recording by the duo following Crystal Silence (1972).

Reception 
The Allmusic review by Scott Yanow awarded the album 4 stars stating "This subtle set finds Burton and Corea consistently inspiring each other through melodic and very spontaneous improvising. Well worth a close listen".

Track listing 
All compositions by Chick Corea except where noted.
 "Duet Suite" - 15:41 
 "Children's Song No. 15" - 1:15 
 "Children's Song No. 2" - 0:56 
 "Children's Song No. 5" - 1:14 
 "Children's Song No. 6" - 2:13 
 "Radio" (Steve Swallow) - 5:15 
 "Song to Gayle" - 7:13 
 "Never" (Swallow) - 7:37 
 "La Fiesta" - 10:17

Personnel 
Gary Burton — vibraphone
Chick Corea — piano

Charts

References 

ECM Records albums
Gary Burton albums
Chick Corea albums
1979 albums
Grammy Award for Best Jazz Instrumental Album